The Sattalites are a Canadian reggae group. Founded in Toronto, Ontario as a music school in 1981, the band has become one of the most successful Canadian reggae ensembles. They signed with the Canadian record label Solid Gold Records early in their career and have been with them ever since. Their style has been described as a radio-friendly combination of lover's rock and dancehall.

History
Jo Jo Bennett and Fergus Hambleton, the first members of the Sattalites, met while touring with reggae singer Afreen and the pair began performing together, mixing Bennett's instrumentals with Hambleton's smooth alto voice to create the Sattalites' sound. The band started as a teaching group who opened the Sattalites Music School on a pay-what-you-can basis to spread their influence in 1981. The Sattalites consisted of various types of students from the school who wanted a sense of live performing. By 1982, the Sattalites had melded into a collaboration of musicians from talented beginners to experienced pros, some of whom still perform. They became very well known for their enthusiastic live performances which initiated their extensive touring across Canada and the United States. It was the only Canadian band ever invited to play at Jamaica's "Sunsplash", playing before 25,000 people, and they also performed at the 1993/94 World Skiing Championship in Whistler, British Columbia. As two-time Juno winners, the Sattalites are one of Canada's longest standing reggae groups.

Members
Fergus Hambleton has been the lead vocalist of the Sattalites since the band's beginning. He also plays the guitar, alto saxophone and the keyboard and has played in other bands including A Passing Fancy and the Ginger Group. Vocalist Jo Jo Bennett, a founding member of the group, also played the flugelhorn and percussion. The other six members are David Fowler (keyboards), Bruce McGillivray (bass), Neville Francis(rhythm guitar, backup, and lead vocals), Junior McPherson (drums and percussion), Rick Morrison (saxophone) and Bruce 'Preacher' Robinson (piano and vocals). During the 1980s and 1990s, Felix Taylor played trombone and sang background vocals. Neil Chapman was a member for their first three albums, playing lead guitar, and has also guested on later recordings as well live on stage.

Discography
Albums
 1985 Sattalites
 1987 Live via Sattalites
 1989 Miracles
 1993 All Over the World
 1995 Now and Forever
 2003 Reggaefication

Singles
 "Wild"
 “Gimme Some Kinda Sign” (#44 Can Pop / #9 Can AC)
 “Too Late to Turn Back Now” (#17 Can AC / #1 CanCon)
 “Now and Forever”
 “I’m Gonna Be The One”
 “Miracles”
 "The Reason Why"
 “Rendezvous”
 “Walkin On Sunshine”

References

External links
 The Sattalites catalog at Solid Gold Records
 The Sattalites at Canadian Reggae World
 The Sattalites at MySpace
 
 
 
 
 

Canadian reggae musical groups
Canadian ska groups
Musical groups from Toronto
Musical groups established in 1981
1981 establishments in Ontario
Juno Award for Reggae Recording of the Year winners
Axe Records artists